Sivas 4 Eylül Stadium was a multi-purpose stadium in Sivas, Turkey. It was used mostly for football matches and was the former home ground of Sivasspor. The stadium held 14,998 people.

In 2005 the stadium was renovated with extra 1,200 seats and was initially painted red and white.

Notes and references

External links
 Venue information
 Sivasspor Fan Site
 About Sivasspor and Sivas 4 Eylül Stadium 
 Stadium Guide profile

Football venues in Turkey
Sivasspor
Multi-purpose stadiums in Turkey
Süper Lig venues
Sports venues completed in 1985
1985 establishments in Turkey